Kalen Kannu is a special Award given by the Chairman of the Finnish Ice Hockey Federation: Kalervo Kummola

Winners:

 1998-1999 Jouko Lukkarila
 1999-2000 Timo Tuomi
 2000-2001 Timo Jutila
 2001-2002 Kari Lehtonen
 2002-2003 Esa Pirnes
 2003-2004 Tampereen Ilves C-Junior team
 2004-2005 Heikki Seppälä
 2005-2006 Mika Toivola
 2006-2007 Kajaanin Hokki
 2007-2008 Eero Lehti
 2008-2009 Toni Rajala
 2009-2010 Sami Vatanen
 2010-2011 Jukka Jalonen
 2011-2012 Prize not awarded
 2012-2013 Karri Kivi
 2013-2014 Erkka Westerlund
 2014-2015 Veini Vehviläinen
 2015-2016 Jussi Ahokas
 2016-2017 Juha Junno
 2017-2018 JYP
 2018-2019 Jukka Jalonen
Liiga trophies and awards